Michael Cohen may refer to:

Arts and entertainment
 Michael D. Cohen (actor) (born 1975), Canadian actor
 Michael Cohen (musician) (1951–1997), 1970s singer-songwriter
 Michael Cohen (writer) (born 1970), Australian writer on paranormal phenomena
 Michaël Cohen (born 1970), French actor
Michael Cohen (Israeli musician) (born 1986), Israeli rapper and record producer

Education
 Michael A. Cohen, director of the Graduate Program in International Affairs at The New School
 Michael D. Cohen (academic) (1945–2013), professor of complex systems, information and public policy at the University of Michigan
 Michael Cohen, regent of the University of California

Law
 Michael Cohen (lawyer) (born 1966), American former attorney who was U.S. President Donald Trump's personal lawyer
 Michael H. Cohen, American attorney, professor, and author

Science and technology
 Michael Cohen (doctor) (1937–2018), doctor of dental medicine who first identified Proteus syndrome
 Michael Cohen (pharmacist), president of the Institute for Safe Medication Practices
 Michael F. Cohen, American computer graphics researcher

Others
 Michael Cohen (cricketer) (born 1998), South African cricketer
 Michael Cohen (politician), former member of the New York State Assembly

See also
 List of people with surname Cohen
 Mickey Cohen (soccer), American soccer goalkeeper
 Mickey Cohen (1913–1976), American gangster
 Mike Cohen 
 Michel Cohen, art dealer